The  2006–07 Tercera División was the fourth tier of the football pyramid in Spain. Play started in August 2006 and ended in May 2007.

Classification

Group I

Group II

Group III

Group IV

Group V

Group VI

Group VII

Group VIII

Group IX

Group X

Group XI

Group XII

Group XIII

Group XIV

Group XV

Group XVI

Group XVII

Group XVIII

Notes

External links
All information is courtesy of Futbolme.com

 
Tercera División seasons
4
Spain